Serhiy Olehovych Politylo (born 9 January 1989) is a Ukrainian professional footballer who plays as a midfielder for Chornomorets Odesa.

Career
He was promoted to the senior side from Chornomorets Reserves in November 2006.

External links
 
 

1989 births
Living people
People from Novovolynsk
Ukrainian footballers
Piddubny Olympic College alumni
FC Chornomorets Odesa players
FC Dnister Ovidiopol players
FC Dnipro players
FC Volyn Lutsk players
Ukrainian Premier League players
Ukrainian First League players
FC Okzhetpes players
Ukrainian expatriate footballers
Expatriate footballers in Kazakhstan
Ukrainian expatriate sportspeople in Kazakhstan
Association football midfielders
Adana Demirspor footballers
Expatriate footballers in Turkey
Ukrainian expatriate sportspeople in Turkey
FC Olimpik Donetsk players
FC Lviv players
Ukraine youth international footballers
Sportspeople from Volyn Oblast